Oedaleosia concolor is a moth of the  subfamily Arctiinae. It was described by Strand in 1912. It is found in Sudan.

References

Endemic fauna of Sudan
Lithosiini
Moths described in 1912